Kannauj (Hindustani pronunciation: [kənːɔːd͡ʒ]) is a city, administrative headquarters and a municipal board or Nagar Palika Parishad in Kannauj district in the Indian state of Uttar Pradesh. The city's name is a corrupted form of the classical name Kanyakubja. It was also known as Mahodaya during the time of Mihira Bhoja. It is situated 123 kilometres west of the state capital, Lucknow.

Kannauj is an ancient city. It is said that the Kanyakubja Brahmins who included Shandilya (teacher of Rishi Bharadwaja) were held one of the three prominent families originally from Kannauj.

In Classical India, it served as the center of imperial Indian dynasties. The earliest of these was the Maukhari dynasty, and later, Emperor Harsha of the Vardhana dynasty. The city later came under the Gahadavala dynasty, and under the rule of Govindachandra, the city reached "unprecedented glory". Kannauj was also the main place of war in the Tripartite struggle between the Gurjara-Pratihara, the Palas and the Rashtrakutas.

However, the "glory of Imperial Kannauj" ended with conquests of the Delhi Sultanate.

Kannauj is famous for distilling of scents. It is known as "India's perfume capital" and is famous for its traditional Kannauj Perfume, a government protected entity,

Kannauj itself has more than 200 perfume distilleries and is a market center for perfume, tobacco and rose water. It has given its name to a distinct dialect of the Hindustani known as Kannauji, which has two different codes or registers.

History

Early history
Archaeological discoveries show that Kannauj was inhabited by the Painted Grey Ware and Northern Black Polished Ware cultures, ca. 1200-600 BCE and ca. 700-200 BCE, respectively. Under the names of Kuśasthala and Kanyakubja, it is mentioned as a well-known town in the Hindu Epics, the Mahabharata and the Ramayana, and by the grammarian Patanjali (ca. 150 BCE). The early Buddhist literature mentions Kannauj as Kannakujja, and refers to its location on the trade route from Mathura to Varanasi and Rajgir.

Kannauj may have been known to the Greco-Roman civilization under the name of Kanagora or Kanogiza, which appears in Geography by Ptolemy (ca. 140 CE), but this identification is not confirmed. It was also visited by the Chinese Buddhist travellers Faxian and Xuanzang in the fifth and seventh centuries CE, respectively.

Kannauj formed part of the Gupta Empire. During the decline of the Gupta Empire in the 6th century, the Maukhari dynasty of Kannauj - who had served as vassal rulers under the Guptas - took advantage of the weakening of central authority, broke away and established control over large areas of northern India.

Under the Maukharis, Kannauj continued to grow in importance and prosperity. It became the greatest city of Northern India under Emperor Harsha (r. 606 to 647 CE) of the Vardhana dynasty, who conquered it and made it his capital. Chinese pilgrim Xuanzang visited India during the reign of Harsha, and described Kannauj as a large, prosperous city with many Buddhist monasteries. Harsha died with no heir, resulting in a power vacuum until Maharaja Yashovarman seized power as the ruler of Kannauj.

The Kannauj Triangle

Kannauj became a focal point for three powerful dynasties, namely the Gurjara Pratiharas (r. 730-1036 CE), Palas (r. 750-1162 CE) and Rashtrakutas (r. 753-982 CE), between the 8th and 10th centuries. The conflict between the three dynasties has been referred to as the Tripartite struggle by many historians.

There were initial struggles but ultimately the Gurjara Pratiharas succeeded in retaining the city. The Gurjara-Pratiharas ruled Avanti (based at Ujjain), which was bounded to the South by the Rashtrakuta Empire, and the Pala Empire to the East. The Tripartite struggle began with the defeat of Indrayudh at the hands of Gurjara-Pratihara ruler Vatsaraja (r. 780-800 CE). The Pala ruler Dharampala (~770-821 CE) was also keen to establish his authority at Kannauj, giving rise to a struggle between Vatsaraja and Dharmapala, in which Dharmapala was defeated. Taking advantage of the chaos, the Rastrakuta ruler Dhruva Dharavarsha (r. 780–793 CE) surged northwards, defeated Vatsaraja, and took Kannauj for himself, completing the furthest northern expansion by a South Indian ruler.

When the Rashtrakuta ruler Dhruva Dharavarsha advanced back to the south, Dharampala was left in control of Kannauj for some time. The struggle between the two northern dynasties of Palas and Gurjara Pratiharas continued: the Pala's vassal Chakrayudha (Dharmapala's nominee for Ujjain) was defeated by the Pratihara Nagabhata II (r. 805–833 CE), and Kannauj was again occupied by the Gurjara Pratiharas. Dharmapala tried to take control of Kannauj but was defeated badly at Moongher by the Gurjara Pratiharas. However, Nagabhata II was in turn soon defeated by the Rashtrakuta Govinda III (r. 793–814 CE), who had initiated a second northern surge. An inscription states that Chakrayudha and Dharmapala invited Govinda III to war against the Gurjara Pratiharas, but Dharmapala and Chakrayudh both submitted to the Govinda III, in order to win his sympathy. After this defeat, Pratihara power degenerated for some time. After the death of Dharampala, Nagabhata II regained hold over Kannuaj and made it the capital of the Gurjara Pratihara Empire. During this period, the Rashtrakutas were facing some internal conflicts, and so they, as well as the Pala Empire, did not contest this. Thus Gurjara Pratiharas became the greatest power in Northern India after occupying Kannauj (9th century CE).

Medieval times
Famous Pir-e-Kamil, Hazrat Pir Shah Jewna Al-Naqvi Al-Bokhari was also born in Kannauj in 1493 in the reign of King Sikandar Lodi. He was a descendant of Jalaluddin Surkh-Posh Bukhari and his father Syed Sadar-ud-din Shah Kabeer Naqvi Al Bukhari was a great saint and was also among the advisors of King Sikandar Lodhi. Shah Jewna migrated to Shah Jeewna (a town named after him) now in Pakistan. Shah Jewna’s colonized towns in Kannauj :- Siray-e-Miran, Bibiyan Jalalpur, Makhdumpur, Lal Pur (associated with the name of Saint Sayyed Jalaluddin Haider Surkh Posh Bukhari or Lal Bukhari). His descendants  still present in various  parts of India and Pakistan.

Sultan Mahmud of Ghazni captured Kanauj in 1018. Chandradeva founded the Gahadvala dynasty with its capital at Kannauj around 1090.  His grandson Govindachandra "raised Kannauj to unprecedented glory." Muhammad Ghori advanced against the city, and in the Battle of Chandwar of 1193 killed Jayachandra.

Alberuni has referred to "Kannoj" as the key geographical point to explain marching distances to other Indian cities. The "glory of Imperial Kannauj" ended with Iltutmish's conquest.

Sher Shah Suri defeated Humayun at the Battle of Kannauj on 17 May 1540.

Colonial period
During early English rule in India, the city was spelled Cannodge by them. The Nawab Hakim Mehndi Ali Khan has been constantly associated with the development of city of Kannauj by the travellers and writers of the period. A ghat (Mehndighat), a Sarai (for the free stay of travellers and merchants) and various metalled roads were built by the Nawab which also bear his name.

Different spellings that are used to refer to Kannauj, apart from the official Kannauj, are: Cannodge, Kannauj, Kannoj, Kinnouge, Qannauj and Qannawj. The British who visited Kannauj in the later part of 19th century mostly referred to it as Kanauj (notice the single "n"). George Forster spells it Kinnouge. Alexander Cunnigham wrote its spelling as Kanoj.

Geography
It has an average elevation of 139 metres (456 feet).

Demographics
 India census, Kannauj had a population of 71,530. Males constitute 53% of the population and females 47%. Kannauj has an average literacy rate of 58%: male literacy is 64%, and female literacy is 52%. In Kannauj, 15% of the population is under 6 years of age.

Colleges

Medical College
Government Medical College, Kannauj is a government medical college located in Tirwa of Kannauj, Uttar Pradesh, India. It is affiliated to King George's Medical University, Lucknow.

Engineering College
Government Engineering College, Kannauj is a government engineering college located at Kannauj. It is a constituent college of Dr. A.P.J. Abdul Kalam Technical University (formerly Uttar Pradesh Technical University) in Lucknow. The college is situated at Aher, Tirwa.

Transportation
The city is served by two major railway station Kannauj railway station and Kannauj City railway station. The nearest airport is Kanpur Airport situated about 2 hours drive from the town.

It is situated on GT road(Delhi to Kanpur). It has road transportation Kannauj Depo. under the Uttar Pradesh State Road Transportation Corporation(UPSRTC).

Notable people

Āma, King of Kannauj
Malini Awasthi, folk singer
Mihira Bhoja, King of North India
Shah Jewna, Missionary or Pir
Siddiq Hasan Khan, Nawab of Bhopal
Sayyid Muhammad Qanauji, Sufi
Samyukta, Princess of Kannauj
Yashovarman, King of Kannauj

See also
Kannauji language

References

Further reading
Majumdar, R. C., In Pusalker, A. D., In Majumdar, A. K., & Bharatiya Vidya Bhavan,. (1993). The age of imperial Kanauj.
Kishori Lal, Munshi, Guldasta e Qannauj (1871)

External links

  District Kannauj Website.
 
 History of Kanauj: To the Moslem Conquest By Rama Shankar Tripathi

 
History of Uttar Pradesh
Former capital cities in India
Rashtrakuta dynasty
Pratihara empire